Luis Ernesto Alva y Talledo, better known as Luigi Alva (born 10 April 1927 in Paíta, Peru) is a Peruvian operatic tenor. A Mozart and Rossini specialist, Alva achieved fame with roles such as Don Ottavio (in Don Giovanni), Count Almaviva (in The Barber of Seville) and Fenton (in Verdi's Falstaff). He retired from the stage in 1989.

Biography
Alva was born in Paita, Peru, and served for a while in the Peruvian Navy before concentrating on a singing career. He studied at the Conservatorio Nacional de Música in Lima under Rosa Mercedes Ayarza de Morales and made his operatic debut in Federico Moreno Torroba's Luisa Fernanda in Lima in 1949. Alva went to Milan in 1953 and studied under Emilio Ghirardini and Ettore Campogalliani. He made his European debut at the Teatro Nuovo in Milan as Alfredo in Verdi's La traviata in 1954, following that as Paolino in Cimarosa's Il matrimonio segreto. His debut at the La Scala came in 1956 as Count Almaviva in Rossini's The Barber of Seville, the role for which he became best known and widely admired. Subsequently he sang with most of the leading opera festivals and companies in the US and Europe. At Glyndebourne he made his debut as Nemorino in Donizetti's L'elisir d'amore. In 1962, Alva made his debut with the Philadelphia Lyric Opera Company as Count Almaviva and in 1964 he made his first appearance at the Metropolitan Opera as Fenton in Verdi's Falstaff. He went on to sing in a further 101 performances at the Met between 1964 and 1975.

Alva had a light lyric tenor voice and was known for the clarity of his diction and his elegant phrasing, a quality which George Jellinek described as compensating for an "underpowered" voice in the 1956 live recording of Così fan tutte from La Scala. He rarely ventured beyond his favourite repertoire, which included Mozart, Rossini, and Donizetti and to which (according to Harold Rosenthal) his "elegant, refined style" was particularly suited. In 1980, he founded the Asociación Prolírica del Perú in Lima and served as its artistic director for several years. He retired from the stage in 1989, but sponsors the Premio Luigi Alva for young singers, gives master classes, and serves as a juror in singing competitions. Alva also teaches singing at La Scuola di Canto (Voice Academy) at La Scala in Milan. Amongst his students there was the Belgian tenor Marc Laho.

In 2005, the Peruvian postal service issued a stamp in his honour and in 2012 he was awarded the Personalidad Meritoria de la Cultura medal by the Peruvian Ministry of Culture.

Roles performed
Alva's roles included the following. Unless otherwise indicated, all roles were performed on stage.

Rossini:
Il Conte d'Almaviva in The Barber of Seville
Don Ramiro in La Cenerentola
Lindoro in L'italiana in Algeri

Mozart:
Don Ottavio in Don Giovanni
Ferrando in Così fan tutte
Alessandro in Il re pastore (recording, 1967)
Tamino in The Magic Flute

Haydn:
Lindoro in La fedeltà premiata (recording, 1976)
Ecclittico in Il mondo della luna
Gernando in L'isola disabitata (recording, 1977)
Sempronio in Lo speziale

Cimarosa:
Paolino in Il matrimonio segreto
Filandro in Le astuzie femminili

Leoncavallo:
Beppe in Pagliacci

Puccini:
Venditore di canzonette in Il tabarro (recording, 1954)

Verdi:
Alfredo in La traviata
Fenton in Falstaff

Schubert:
Alfonso in Alfonso und Estrella (recording, 1956)

Donizetti:
Nemorino in L'elisir d'amore

Handel:
Oronte in Alcina (recording, 1962)
Serse in Serse

Gounod:
Siébel in Faust

Scarlatti:
Roberto in Griselda (recording, 1970)

Filmography

Falstaff (1956), Fenton
Così fan tutte (1970), Ferrando
The Barber of Seville (1972), Count Almaviva 
Don Pasquale (1972), Ernesto
Lo speziale (1982), SempronioSelected discography
Opera
Verdi: Falstaff – (as Fenton) Philharmonia Orchestra and Chorus conducted by Herbert von Karajan, EMI, 1956
Rossini: Il barbiere di Siviglia – (as Count Almaviva) Philharmonia Orchestra and Chorus conducted by Alceo Galliera, EMI, 1957
Mozart: Don Giovanni – (as Don Ottavio) Philharmonia Orchestra and Chorus conducted by Carlo Maria Giulini, EMI, 1959
Mozart: Così fan tutte - (as Ferrando), John Alldis Choir and New Philharmonia Orchestra conducted by Otto Klemperer, EMI, 1971

Recital

 Ay-Ay-Ay'' – Spanish and Latin American songs by Lara, Freire, Ponce, Sandoval, Padilla, Serrano, Álvarez, and Lacalle . New Symphony Orchestra of London conducted by Iller Pattacini. Decca, 1963

See also
 Haydn: La fedeltà premiata (Antal Doráti recording)
 Haydn: Il mondo della luna (Antal Doráti recording)

References

External links

1927 births
People from Piura Region
People from Lima
Living people
Peruvian operatic tenors
Voice teachers
20th-century Peruvian male singers
20th-century Peruvian singers